Concha Calleja (Barcelona, Spain, 10 de julio de 1964) Spanish writer and journalist, her activity has focused on journalism, biographies of historical or famous people, and scripts for movies and TV series of her books.

Her books address the investigation of crimes with the greatest international impact, which could have been orchestrated or are suspected of having been, and the analysis of the characters of the people involved, from a psychological perspective.

Biography 
She studied BS in "Geography and History" at UNED, in addition to "Protocol and Institutional Relationships". She holds a Master of Arts in Counseling Psychology from Cambridge International University; Studied Criminology; "Coaching with PNL and Emotional Intelligence", in Learn Nimbus-Real Results Coaching and "Judicial Expert in Forensic Psychology" by Euroinnova Business School.

Two of her books, Cayetana, Duquesa de Alba and El álbum privado de la Duquesa de Alba, served as a script for the television series La duquesa, which was aired on Tele5. Also, the book La mujer morena, musa de Julio Romero de Torres served as the basis for the documentary that she presented, which was broadcast on Canal Sur TV.

She currently collaborates in the programs of Iker Jiménez, Horizonte, and Cuarto Milenio, based on his investigations into crimes suspected of having been orchestrated, or unresolved.

Books 
Target Michael Jackson. The conspiracy to end the king of pop. EMDE 2020
Objetivo Michael Jackson. La conspiración para acabar con el rey del pop. Arcopress 2019
Diana, Réquiem por una mentira. Arcopress 2017
La duquesa. El café de la rosa 2013
Duquesa de Alba: historia y vida 6 volúmenes 2012
La mujer morena, musa de Julio Romero de Torres. Editorial Almuzara 2011
¡Elemental, querido Watson! Ipuntoediciones 2010
Hombres ilustres, sus cartas de amor. Es ediciones 2008
Diana de Gales, me van a asesinar. Arcopress 2007
El triunfo de Camila. Arcopress 2005
El álbum privado de la duquesa de Alba. Belacqua 2005
Felipe de Borbón, listo para reinar. Espejo de tinta 2004
Tita Cervera, una historia sin título (Biografía de la baronesa Thyssen). Belacqua 2004
Carmen, una historia real. Laberinto 2003
Pasiones insólitas. Belacqua 2003
Bajo el mármol blanco y negro (novela histórica) Plaza & Janés 2002
Cayetana, Pasión andaluza (Biografía autorizada por la duquesa de Alba). Plaza & Janés 2001
El último beso de Cayetana de Alba. Espasa Calpe 1999
Con toda franqueza. Editorial Planeta 1998

References 

Spanish writers
Living people
1964 births